The Women's recurve team event took place on 8 October 2010 at the Yamuna Sports Complex.

Teams
Six teams participated in the competition:

Results

References
 Reports

Archery at the 2010 Commonwealth Games
Common